Omlor is a surname. Notable people with the surname include:

 Yannik Omlor (born 1996), German squash player